Jamie Marsh is an American theatre, television and film actor.

Jamie was born in New York City.  In 1981 while living in Stockholm, Sweden Jamie was cast in his first movie, Montenegro. From 1987 to 1991 Jamie studied with Uta Hagen and Herbert Berghof at HB Studios.

In 1991 Jamie originated the role of Jay Kurnitz in the original cast of the Tony Award and Pulitzer Prize winning play Lost in Yonkers written by Neil Simon.  He performed the play over 800 times on Broadway at The Richard Rodgers Theater.

In 1992 Ellen Burstyn invited Jamie to be a member of The Actors Studio.  Jamie has been an active member of The Actors Studio west coast since 1993, studying with Mark Rydell, Martin Landau, Penelope Allen and Barbara Bain.

Jamie's film appearances include Best Laid Plans, Brainscan and Even Money.

Jamie's TV appearances include ER, X-Files and NYPD Blue.

Jamie has also appeared in national commercials for brands including Coke, Volkswagen, Budweiser, M&M's and AT&T. 
 
Jamie's M&M's commercial has aired on Halloween since 2001 and is considered a 'classic' commercial.

References

External links
 

American male film actors
American male stage actors
Living people
Singers from New York City
American expatriates in Sweden
1966 births